Oberbronn is a commune in the Bas-Rhin department in Grand Est in north-eastern France.

There is a signposted, historic, circular walk through the village. From an observation tower on the nearby Wasenkoepfel (526m) there are views of the Upper Rhine Plain.

Population

See also
 Communes of the Bas-Rhin department

References

Communes of Bas-Rhin
Bas-Rhin communes articles needing translation from French Wikipedia
Burial sites of the House of Leiningen